Hanshraj  or Hans Raj may refer to:

People
Hansraj Bhardwaj (born 1937), Indian politician
Hansraj Gangaram Ahir (born 1954), member of the 14th Lok Sabha of India
Hansraj Gupta (1902–1988), Indian mathematician specialising in number theory
Hans Raj Hans (born 1964), Punjabi singer
Hans Raj Khanna (1912–2008), judge at the Supreme Court of India (1971–1977)
Jugal Hansraj (born 1972), Indian actor and director presently based at Mumbai
Lala Hansraj Gupta, educationist, social worker and philanthropist, Padma Vibhushan recipient
Mahatma Hansraj (1864–1938), follower of Swami Dayanand, who founded Dayanand Anglo-Vedic Schools System in Lahore in 1886

Institutions
Hans Raj College, Delhi
Hans Raj Model School, New Delhi
Hansraj Morarji Public School, combined primary, junior and senior school in Mumbai, India
Kulachi Hansraj Model School, Dayanand Anglo Vedic school established in 1972 by the late Shri Darbari Lal

Indian masculine given names